The 2012–13 Taça de Portugal was the 73rd season of the Taça de Portugal, the premier Portuguese football knockout cup competition organized by the Portuguese Football Federation (FPF). It was contested by a total of 162 teams competing in the top four tiers of Portuguese football. The competition began with the first round matches in August 2012 and concluded with the final on 26 May 2013, at the Estádio Nacional in Oeiras.

Vitória de Guimarães were the winners, following their 2–1 defeat of Benfica. They secured their first title in the competition after five previous failed attempts and became the twelfth team to win the Taça de Portugal – the first first-time winners since Beira-Mar in 1999. With this victory, Vitória de Guimarães qualified for the 2013–14 UEFA Europa League group stage.

Académica de Coimbra were the defending champions after defeating Sporting CP 1–0 in the previous season's final, but were eliminated in the quarter-finals by Benfica.

Format 
As in the previous season, the competition format was organized in a knockout system consisting of seven rounds, which preceded the final match. Teams competing in the Segunda Divisão and Terceira Divisão, respectively the third and fourth tiers of Portuguese football, entered the competition in the first round. In the second round, Segunda Liga teams were joined by the first round winners and the remaining Second and/or Third Division teams that received a bye in the previous round. The second round winners advanced to the third round, where they met the top tier Primeira Liga teams for the first time. Unlike the previous rounds, which were contested in one-legged fixtures, the semi-finals were played over two legs in a home-and-away basis. The final was played at a neutral venue, the Estádio Nacional in Oeiras.

Teams 
A total of 162 teams from the top four tiers of the national football system from were considered eligible by FPF to participate in the competition:

Schedule 
All draws were held at the FPF headquarters in Lisbon.

First round 
Teams from the Segunda Divisão (II) and Terceira Divisão (III) entered in this initial round. The draw was made on 2 August 2012 and determined the 100 teams contesting this round and the remaining 30 teams with a bye into the second round. Matches were played mainly on 26 August, with a few taking place the day before and later on 9 September 2012.

The following 30 teams were given a bye into the second round:

 1º de Dezembro (II)
 Aguiar da Beira (III)
 Amarante (II)
 Amora (III)
 Anadia (II)
 Benfica Castelo Branco (II)
 Cartaxo (III)
 Casa Pia (II)
 Coimbrões  (II)
 Estarreja (III)
 Fafe (II)
 Lagoa (III)
 Leça (III)
 Marítimo da Graciosa (III)
 Monção (III)
 Oliveirense (III)
 Padroense (II)
 Pampilhosa (II)
 Paredes (III)
 Penalva do Castelo (III)
 Peniche (III)
 Ponte da Barca (III)
 Quarteirense (II)
 Sampedrense (III)
 Sourense (III)
 Sporting de Pombal (III)
 Tocha (II)
 União de Lamas (III)
 Vila Meã (III)
 Vitória do Pico (III)

Lourinhanense, Melgacense, Santa Maria and Limianos were the only Third Division teams to eliminate opponents from the upper Second Division tier.

Second round 
The 50 winners from the first round joined the 30 teams awarded with a second round bye and the 16 teams competing in the Segunda Liga (SL), the second tier league. The draw took place on 31 August 2012 and matches were played mainly on 16 September 2012, with a few games taking place the day before.

Third Division teams Aliados de Lordelo, Caldas, Lourinhanense, Oliveira do Hospital and Santa Eulália were the only teams to eliminate opponents from better ranked leagues. Lourinhanense defeated a Second Division team for the second consecutive time.

Third round 
The 16 teams competing in the top tier Primeira Liga enter the tournament at this stage, where they are joined by the 48 winners of the previous round. The draw for this round took place on 25 September 2012, and matches were played mostly during the weekend of 20–21 October 2012. The matches involving Benfica and Braga were played respectively on the 18 and 19 October, due to broadcasting purposes, whereas the match between Caldas and Coimbrões was postponed to 2 December 2012, due to logistical difficulties by the latter club.

Estoril and Sporting CP were the only Primeira Liga teams to fall in this round, both against teams from the same league. For the third and second consecutive round, respectively, Lourinhanense (III) and Oliveira do Hospital (III) reassured their maintenance in the competition at the expense of opponents from a higher league. Similar achievements were made by Pampilhosa (II), Pedras Rubras (III) and Penalva do Castelo (III).

Fourth round 
The draw for the fourth round took place on 29 October 2012, and matches were played mostly on 18 November 2012, with a few being held earlier on 16 and 17 November. The match between Desportivo das Aves and Coimbrões was played later, on 12 December,  because of the delays resulting from the FPF evaluation of irregularities that occurred in the second round fixture between Operário (II) and Caldas (III).

In this round, three teams eliminated opponents from upper tier leagues: Arouca (SL), Tourizense (II), which advanced to fifth round as the last remaining Second Division team in competition; and giant-killers Lourinhanense (III), who have consecutively beaten teams from stronger leagues since the first round.

Fifth round 
The draw for the fifth round took place on the 20 November 2012, and matches were to be played between 30 November and 2 December 2012. The match opposing Benfica (PL) and Desportivo das Aves (SL) was due to be played on 1 December but was rescheduled to 2 January 2013.

Primeira Liga champions Porto were defeated by league opponents Braga, becoming the second "Big Three" club to be eliminated, after Sporting CP in the third round. None of the last remaining teams from the Second and Third Division survived this round: Tourizense (II) was defeated by title-holders Académica de Coimbra, while Fabril Barreiro (III) lost to Belenenses (SL) and underdogs Lourinhanense (III) were finally halted at home by Paços de Ferreira (PL).

Quarterfinals 
The draw for the quarterfinals – which also determined the pairings for the semifinals – took place on 18 December 2012, and the matches were played on 16–17 January 2013.

Belenenses defeated Arouca in the match between the last surviving Segunda Liga teams, whereas Benfica ended the reign of defending champions Académica de Coimbra with a crushing 4–0 away win.

Semifinals 
The semifinal pairings were previously determined during the draw for the quarterfinals, held on 18 December 2012. This round is contested over two legs, with the first leg taking place on 30 January 2013 and the second leg on 17 April 2013.

First leg

Second leg

Final

Top goalscorers

Last update: 26 May 2013

Notes

References

External links
Official webpage 

2012-13
2012–13 domestic association football cups
2012–13 in Portuguese football